The 10th Politburo of the Lao People's Revolutionary Party (LPRP), officially the Political Bureau of the 10th Central Committee of the Lao People's Revolutionary Party, was elected in 2016 by the 1st Plenary Session of the 10th Central Committee, in the immediate aftermath of the 10th National Congress.

7th-ranked member Saysomphone Phomvihane is the son of former LPRP General Secretary Kaysone Phomvihane.

Members

References

Specific

Bibliography
Articles:
 

10th Politburo of the Lao People's Revolutionary Party
2016 establishments in Laos
2021 disestablishments in Laos